Gastone Bottini (born 24 February 1987) is an Italian professional footballer.

Club career

On November 28, 2006 Bottini made his first-team debut for A.C. Milan in a Coppa Italia game against Brescia, replacing Marco Borriello in the final minutes.

In 2009, he left for Valenzana.

References

External links
Profile at official club website 
Profile at Assocalciatori.it 
 

1987 births
Living people
Sportspeople from Varese
Italian footballers
A.C. Milan players
Calcio Lecco 1912 players
Association football midfielders
A.C. Montichiari players
Footballers from Lombardy
S.G. Gallaratese A.S.D. players